The 1913–14 Scottish Division Two was won by Cowdenbeath, with Johnstone finishing bottom.

Table

References 

 Scottish Football Archive

Scottish Division Two seasons
2